This article is about the particular significance of the year 1786 to Wales and its people.

Incumbents
Lord Lieutenant of Anglesey - Henry Paget 
Lord Lieutenant of Brecknockshire and Monmouthshire – Charles Morgan of Dderw
Lord Lieutenant of Caernarvonshire - Thomas Bulkeley, 7th Viscount Bulkeley
Lord Lieutenant of Cardiganshire – Wilmot Vaughan, 1st Earl of Lisburne
Lord Lieutenant of Carmarthenshire – John Vaughan  
Lord Lieutenant of Denbighshire - Richard Myddelton  
Lord Lieutenant of Flintshire - Sir Roger Mostyn, 5th Baronet 
Lord Lieutenant of Glamorgan – John Stuart, Lord Mountstuart
Lord Lieutenant of Merionethshire - Sir Watkin Williams-Wynn, 4th Baronet
Lord Lieutenant of Montgomeryshire – George Herbert, 2nd Earl of Powis
Lord Lieutenant of Pembrokeshire – Sir Hugh Owen, 5th Baronet (until 16 January); Richard Philipps, 1st Baron Milford (from 11 June)
Lord Lieutenant of Radnorshire – Edward Harley, 4th Earl of Oxford and Earl Mortimer

Bishop of Bangor – John Warren
Bishop of Llandaff – Richard Watson
Bishop of St Asaph – Jonathan Shipley
Bishop of St Davids – Edward Smallwell

Events
25 December - Plymouth ironworks is leased to Richard Hill.
The Kinmel estate is sold to the Rev Edward Hughes for £42,000.
Abraham Rees completes his edition of Chambers 's Encyclopaedia, and is elected a Fellow of the Royal Society in recognition of his work.
Charles Pratt is created Earl Camden.

Arts and literature

New books
David Samwell - A Narrative of the Death of Captain James Cook
Hester Lynch Piozzi - Anecdotes of the late Samuel Johnson, Ll.D., during the last twenty years of his life
Helen Maria Williams - Poems

Music
William Ellis - Ychydig o Hymnau a Chaniadau Newyddion (collection of hymns)
Benjamin Francis - Aleluia (collection of hymns)

Births
6 April - John Humffreys Parry, barrister and antiquary (died 1825)
May - John Jones, printer and inventor (died 1865)
22 June - Ellis Evans, minister and author (died 1864)
22 July - John Edward Madocks, MP for Denbigh (died 1837)

Deaths
16 January - Sir Hugh Owen, 5th Baronet, politician, about 55
21 January - Anthony Bacon, ironmaster, 67
12 March - Barbara Herbert, Countess of Powis, 51
2 July (bur.) - John Ystumllyn, gardener, "first well-recorded black person of North Wales"
16 September - Edward Parry, poet and hymn-writer, 63

References

Wales
Wales